ESMT (Ecole Supérieure Multinationale des Télécommunications) is an international institution of higher learning based in Senegal. It offers professional certifications and graduate programs in telecommunication.

History 

The organisation was created in 1981 by seven West African states, (Benin, Burkina Faso, Mali, Mauritania, Niger, Senegal, and Togo) on the basis of an initial UNDP programme and funding. In 1986, the school obtained a diplomatic status in Senegal with the headquarters agreement. In 1998, Guinea (Conakry) joined the other seven countries as founding state.

Activities 

The organisation is involved in initial training, continuous training and research.

External links 
 Official site

Universities and colleges in Senegal
Telecommunication education
Educational institutions established in 1981
1981 establishments in Senegal
Education in Dakar